Cerianthula is a genus of cnidarians belonging to the family Botrucnidiferidae.

The species of this genus are found in Atlantic Ocean.

Species

Species:

Cerianthula atlantica 
Cerianthula atlantica 
Cerianthula benguelaensis

References

Botrucnidiferidae
Anthozoa genera